Mara Isabella Yokohama (born May 20, 1991), known professionally as Mara Lopez, is a Filipino-American actress and surfer. She is a member of Star Magic Batch 13.

Early life
Mara Lopez was born on May 20, 1991 in San Pablo, California, the daughter of beauty queen, Bb. Pilipinas Universe 1982 and actress Maria Isabel Lopez with Japanese ex-husband Hiroshi Yokohama. She is the older of two siblings. Her younger brother is five years younger.

Career

Acting
Lopez made her acting debut in 2003, playing a younger version of her real-life mother Maria Isabel Lopez, in an episode in GMA's Magpakailanman.

In 2006 she was launched, along with 23 other aspiring actors and actresses, as a member of Star Magic Batch 13.  She then starred in ABS-CBN's Sineserye Presents: Natutulog Ba Ang Diyos?.
In 2002, she played the lead role in the indie film Following Rosa, a Sundance Film Festival entry.

Yokohama was one of the castaways of Survivor Philippines: Celebrity Doubles Showdown in November 2011.

In 2015, she was now a freelancer.

Sports
Her father Hiroshi Yokohama was the one who taught Mara how to surf. She learned how to surf at age 6 in the coastal barangay of Urbiztondo in La Union.  In 2002 she won the Surfing Championship-Ladies Division at 11 and became the youngest Filipina surfing champion.

Aside from surfing, she also practices Brazilian jiu-jitsu. She first introduced the sport under the guidance of actor Sid Lucero.

Filmography

Television

Film

Notes

References

External links 
 

1991 births
Living people
Actresses from Metro Manila
Filipina gravure idols
People from Quezon City
People from San Pablo, California
Filipino practitioners of Brazilian jiu-jitsu
Filipino martial artists
Filipino surfers
Filipino people of Japanese descent
Actresses of Japanese descent
ABS-CBN personalities
Star Magic
Participants in Philippine reality television series
Survivor Philippines contestants
GMA Network personalities